Chenzhou is a prefecture-level city located in the south of Hunan province, China, bordering the provinces of Jiangxi to the east and Guangdong to the south.

History
Chenzhou is a historical city dating back from the Qin Dynasty. The area was historically named Guiyang (simplified Chinese: 桂阳; traditional Chinese: 桂陽; pinyin: Guìyáng)  Commandery before being renamed to the current name in the year 735 during the Tang Dynasty. The Chinese character 郴, meaning "City in the Forest", uniquely refers to only the area. Known to be popular among the literacy circle of the Tang courts, poets such as Wang Changling, Du Fu, Han Yu, Liu Yuxi and Qin Guan have visited and wrote poems to the natural beauty of the area.

According to unsourced claims from Jung Chang and Jon Halliday in their book Mao: The Unknown Story, Chenzhou, along with neighboring Leiyang city was razed in 1928 by troops (Chinese Red Army) under the command of Zhu De, who was following directives which originated in Moscow and passed on by higher officials of the Chinese Communist Party. The strategy was to leave large numbers of peasants from the cities with no option but to join communist uprisings. 

Chenzhou was the site of a large investigation when its municipal government and party committee, led by Secretary Li Dalun, was charged on multiple counts of corruption in June 2006.

Geography
Chenzhou is situated at the juncture of Hunan and Guangdong provinces at the foot of small Qitian Mountains of the Nanling Mountain Range. Places of interest, natural scenic spots, ancient relics and buildings make for over 100 tourism spots in the city. The major ones are the Suxian Hill, the Wanhuayan, the Dongjiang Lake, and the Wugai Mountain Hunting Field.

Climate
Chenzhou has a humid subtropical climate (Köppen climate classification: Cfa), with four distinct seasons. Spring is subject to heavy rainfall, while the summers are long, hot, and humid with lesser rainfall, and autumn is comfortable and rather dry. Winter is rather brief, but cold snaps occur with temperatures occasionally dropping below freezing, and while not heavy, rain can be frequent.

Administrative divisions

Beihu District, . Population: 300,000 (2003).
Suxian District, . Population: 249,900
Zixing City . Population: 360,000
Guiyang County, . Population: 790,000
Yongxing County, . Population: 630,000
Yizhang County, . Population: 560,000
Jiahe County, . Population: 340,000
Linwu County, . Population: 310,000
Rucheng County, . Population: 360,000
Guidong County, . Population: 170,000
Anren County, . Population: 390,000

Economy

Major deposits of tungsten, bismuth and molybdenum make Chenzhou a production base for non-ferrous metals.

Colleges and universities 

 Xiangnan University

Notable people
Duan Yixuan, a singer and actress
Long Yang, a hostess in CCTV
Ouyang Jingling, a paralympic athlete
Xue Yiwei, Chinese writer living in Montreal
Li Xingxue (李星学), Chinese botanist and member of Chinese Academy of Sciences

Government

The current CPC Party Secretary of Chenzhou is Yi Pengfei and the current Mayor is Liu Zhiren.

Tourism
The areas of interest in Chenzhou include: Wanhua Rock, Wugai Mountain Hunting Field, Suxian Hill and Dongjiang Lake. The city is served by Chenzhou Beihu Airport.

References

External links
Chenzhou News Website, run by Chenzhou Government
Official website of Chenzhou Government

 
Cities in Hunan